3Blue1Brown is a math YouTube channel created and run by Grant Sanderson. The channel focuses on teaching higher mathematics from a visual perspective, and on the process of discovery and inquiry-based learning in mathematics, which Sanderson calls "inventing math". , the channel has 5.02 million subscribers.

Early life and education
Sanderson graduated from Stanford University in 2015 with a bachelor's degree in math. He worked for Khan Academy from 2015 to 2016 as part of their content fellowship program, producing videos and articles about multivariable calculus, after which he started focusing his full attention on 3Blue1Brown.

Career 
3Blue1Brown started as a personal programming project in early 2015. In a podcast of Showmakers, Sanderson explained that he wanted to practice his coding skills and decided to make a graphics library in Python, which eventually became the open-source project "Manim" (short for Mathematical Animation engine). To have a goal for the project, he decided to create a video with the library and upload it to YouTube. On March 4, 2015, he uploaded his first video. He started to publish more videos and to improve the graphics tool.

In 2020, Grant Sanderson became one of the creators and lecturers of the MIT course Introduction to Computational Thinking, together with Alan Edelman, David Sanders, James Schloss, and Benoit Forget. The course uses the Julia programming language and Grant Sanderson's animations to explain various topics: convolutions, image processing, COVID-19 data visualization, epidemic modelling, ray tracing, introduction to climate modelling, ocean modelling, and the algorithms that lie behind these topics.

Videos
3Blue1Brown videos are themed around visualizing math, including pure math such as number theory and topology as well as more applied topics in computer science and physics. The visuals are predominantly generated by Manim, a Python animation library written by Sanderson, though occasionally visuals are drawn from other software such as macOS's Grapher application.

The channel's videos have been featured in Popular Mechanics, ABC News, and Quanta Magazine. Sanderson appeared on the podcasts of Numberphile, Lex Fridman, the Art of Problem Solving, Siraj Raval, and Showmakers.

In February 2022, Sanderson determined that the best starting word on the game Wordle was CRANE. Later on, he stated that the code he wrote to determine the best starting word had a bug in it.

Talks

In January 2020, Sanderson delivered a talk in An Evening with Grant Sanderson, hosted by the Stanford Speakers Bureau. Sanderson offered his perspective on engaging with math: instead of prioritizing usefulness, he emphasizes emotion, wonder and imagination. He aims to "bring life to math" with visuals, graphics, and animations. In August 2021, Sanderson was one of several featured speakers at SIGGRAPH 2021.

In November 2022, Sanderson delivered a keynote speech titled "What can algorithms teach us about education?" at the 17th Dutch National Informatics Congress CelerIT hosted by Stichting Nationaal Informatica Congres (SNiC).  Sanders offered his perspective on how mathematics education should evolve in the future and related his findings with the way neural networks learn, he emphasizes the need for students to grasp concepts and understand them.

References

Further reading

External links 

Manim GitHub repository

Living people
English-language YouTube channels
Mathematics popularizers
Science-related YouTube channels
Education-related YouTube channels
Patreon creators
Year of birth missing (living people)